The Tirana dialect (in dialect Dialekti i Tironës) of the Albanian language is spoken by Albanians who were raised in Tirana and is part of Southern Gheg dialect of Elbasanisht.

References

Culture in Tirana
Albanian language
City colloquials
Languages of Albania